English Center Suspension Bridge is a historic suspension bridge spanning Little Pine Creek in Pine Township, Lycoming County, Pennsylvania.

It was added to the National Register of Historic Places in 1978.

See also
List of bridges documented by the Historic American Engineering Record in Pennsylvania

References

External links

Road bridges on the National Register of Historic Places in Pennsylvania
Bridges completed in 1891
Bridges in Lycoming County, Pennsylvania
Suspension bridges in Pennsylvania
Historic American Engineering Record in Pennsylvania
1891 establishments in Pennsylvania
National Register of Historic Places in Lycoming County, Pennsylvania